WildMIDI is a free open-source software synthesizer which converts MIDI note data into an audio signal using GUS sound patches without need for a GUS patch-compatible soundcard. WildMIDI, whose aim is to be as small as possible and easily portable, started in December 2001, can act as a virtual MIDI device, capable of receiving MIDI data from any program and transforming it into audio on-the-fly. It is the standard MIDI renderer for the GStreamer framework.

Features

WildMIDI consists of two parts, the library which other applications can link against and a command-line (CLI) player used to show off the features of the library itself.

Library features
 RIFF MIDI file support (.RIF)
 Playback of MIDI format 0, 1 and 2 support (.MID)
 Playback of MIDI-likes: HMI, HMP, MUS and XMI
 Cross Platform: Linux, Windows, OSX, *BSD, *DOS, etc.
 Thread safe
 PCM stream output
 WAV file output
 Linear and Gaussian re-sampling
 Final output reverb engine
 Timidity.cfg compatibility

Player features
 OSS output on Linux/UNIX
 ALSA output on Linux
 WinMM output on Windows
 OpenAL output on all supported platforms
 Sound Blaster output under DOS
 WAV output to filesystem

History
WildMIDI was originally conceived in December 2001 as an experiment to see if MIDI files could be played using the same samples as existing software but with less overhead. The first release of the CLI player was in 2002 and thanks to the support of the Quakeforge developers, it was later split into a library and player. In 2003, Quakeforge started using the library in their project. The first official release of WildMIDI was in 2004. After many updates, Chris Ison stopped development in February 2012 with version 0.2.3.5 and has been missing since then. WildMIDI was forked in 2013 by Bret Curtis who now maintains the project. A re-factored WildMIDI was released as version 0.3.0 in 2014. The next release, 0.4.0 was released in July 2016 which added additional functionality such as support for MIDI-like file formats, their conversions to MIDI and additional APIs.

Used in projects
 QuakeForge
 GStreamer
 Qmmp
 Music Player Daemon
 Rosa Media Player
 ThirdEye
 XLEngine: DaggerXL 
 OpenTESArena

See also 

TiMidity++
FluidSynth

References

External links 
WildMIDI home page
WildMIDI package for Ubuntu
WildMIDI package for Debian

2001 software
Free audio software
Open source software synthesizers
Media players